17 Hours is a 2011 Spanish political thriller film directed by Chema de la Peña which stars Paco Tous, Juan Diego, Fernando Cayo, Mariano Venancio, and Ginés García Millán. It consists of a retelling of the 1981 coup d'etat attempt in Spain.

Plot 
Taking place over the course of 17 hours, the plot consists of a reconstruction of the 23-February 1981 coup d'etat attempt in Spain helmed by Antonio Tejero, Alfonso Armada, and Jaime Milans del Bosch. Similarly to other fiction works, the narrative underpins the interpretations of the events posed by Javier Cercas in The Anatomy of a Moment.

Cast

Production 
The film is a Lazona and Wave AIE production, and it had the participation of TVE, Telemadrid, and Canal+.

Release 
It was theatrically released on 23 February 2011.

Reception 
Mirito Torreiro of Fotogramas rated the film 1 out of 5 stars, singling out a good supporting cast as the best thing about the film, otherwise dragged by its stiffness, its fainting TV-movie looks, its flat mise-en-scène and its own obviousness.

Irene Crespo of Cinemanía rated the film 2 out of 5 stars, assessing that the film "does not contribute anything in historical matters, nor does it really delve into the psychology of any of the protagonists", also wondering what is the point in portraying Tejero almost as if he were a "crazy (good) man who is even pitiful by the end of the film".

Jordi Costa of El País considered that the film, "unable to get rid of its overdimensioned third-rate TV movie looks", features a background of "inattention, but also irresponsibility and a non-negligible degree of immaturity" on the part of its makers.

Accolades 

|-
| rowspan = "2" align = "center" | 2012 || 26th Goya Awards || Best Supporting Actor || Juan Diego ||  || align = "center" | 
|-
| 21st Actors and Actresses Union Awards || Best Film Actor in a Minor Role || Ginés García Millán ||  || align = "center" | 
|}

See also 
 List of Spanish films of 2011

References 

2010s Spanish-language films
Spanish political thriller films
Films set in 1981
Films set in Madrid
Films about coups d'état
2010s Spanish films
Films about the Spanish Transition